Emilio Rodríguez (Madrid 1918 - id. 1983) was a Spanish actor. During the Spanish post-war, he worked as a police man and he was a volunteer at División Azul. Between 1950 and 1960 he was a supporting actor. He played Inspector Ballestero in Deadfall (1968), starring Michael Caine, and Warden in Kid Rodelo (1966) At the age of 50 he retired for health problems, and then he starred in Crónicas de un pueblo, in the role of the teacher D. Antonio. After the death of Francisco Franco he was categorized as a francoist character. He finally appeared in Verano azul, and died in 1983.

Cast

References

External links
 

1918 births
1983 deaths
Spanish police officers
Male Spaghetti Western actors
Spanish male film actors
Spanish male television actors
Spanish military personnel of World War II